Sonja Denise Plack ( Williams; born May 9, 1964), known professionally as Sonja Sohn, is an American actress, activist and filmmaker, best known for portraying Baltimore detective Kima Greggs in the HBO drama The Wire (2002–2008). She is also known for having starred in the independent film Slam, which she co-wrote, and appearing as Samantha Baker in the ABC series Body of Proof. Her role in  The Wire led to her work as the leader of a Baltimore community initiative called ReWired for Change.

Early life
Sohn was born Sonja Denise Williams in Fort Benning, Georgia.  Her mother was Korean and her father was Black. Her parents met when her father was stationed in South Korea after the Korean War. She attended and graduated from Warwick High School in Newport News, Virginia.

Career
 
Before she was an actress, Sohn was a slam poet. While performing her work on stage, she was spotted by Marc Levin who offered her a role in his film Slam. She also wrote lyrics and co-wrote the script for the film. It went on to win the Grand Jury Prize for Dramatic Film at the Sundance Film Festival. After debuting in Slam, Sohn appeared in minor roles in films such as Shaft and Bringing Out the Dead. She also starred in independent films Perfume, G and The Killing Zone.  Through the five seasons of the HBO series The Wire, she held a starring role as Detective Kima Greggs.

She struggled during the first season of The Wire and considered quitting as she had trouble recalling her lines. She has also guest-starred on many episodes of Cold Case as "Toni Halstead". She won the supporting television actress award at the 2008 Asian Excellence Awards for her character on The Wire.

She had a supporting role in the Hollywood film Step Up 2: The Streets. In 2008-09, she was a guest star in the ABC series Brothers & Sisters, and in 2010 she appeared in an episode of CBS series The Good Wife. In 2011, she was a guest star on the show Bar Karma. She played Detective Samantha Baker in the first two seasons of the medical drama television series Body of Proof with Dana Delany and Jeri Ryan, which premiered on ABC on March 29, 2011.

On May 30, 2014, it was announced that Sohn would be joining season 2 of The Originals, in a recurring role as the witch Lenore a.k.a. Esther Mikaelson.

Sohn made her directorial debut with the 2017 HBO documentary Baltimore Rising about the 2015 Baltimore protests and community organizing that arose in response to police violence. In 2021, Sohn directed The Slow Hustle, a documentary about the death of Baltimore Homicide Detective Sean Suiter, which was fictionally portrayed in the HBO miniseries We Own This City.

It was announced in May 2022 that Sohn had signed on to ABC's police drama Will Trent as Amanda, the head of the Georgia Bureau of Investigation and Trent's (Ramón Rodríguez) boss. The pilot episode aired January 3, 2023.  Episodes will air on ABC, Tuesdays, 10pm EST and available to watch on Hulu.

Activism
Previously involved in political activism (she campaigned in North Carolina in support of Barack Obama's 2008 presidential bid), Sohn took a break from acting in 2009 to concentrate on social issues. She is the founder and CEO of the Baltimore-based reWIRED for Change, an outreach program intended to communicate with (and ultimately rehabilitate) at-risk youth involved in criminal activity.

The program is run out of the University of Maryland School of Social Work and uses episodes of The Wire as a teaching tool, encouraging the participants to examine and query their lives and past actions. Other actors and writers involved with The Wire serve as board members. In 2011, she was presented with the Woman of the Year award from the Harvard Black Men's Forum.

Personal life
In 2003, Sohn married didgeridoo player Adam Plack. She has two daughters born 1986 and 1990.  Sohn and Plack are divorced. On July 21, 2019, Sohn was arrested in North Carolina and charged with felony possession of cocaine.

Filmography

Film

Television

Director

Awards and nominations

References

External links

reWIRED for Change homepage, rewiredforchange.org; accessed December 8, 2014.  
ReWired and Reading Liverpool Philharmonic , liverpoolphil.com; accessed December 8, 2014. 
ReWired and Reading The Reader Organisation, thereaderonline.co.uk; accessed December 8, 2014.

C-SPAN Q&A interview with Sohn, c-span.org; accessed December 8, 2014.

1964 births
African-American poets
African-American actresses
American poets
American writers of Korean descent
American film actresses
American television actresses
African-American activists
American activists
American actresses of Korean descent
Slam poets
Living people
People from Newport News, Virginia
American women poets
Actresses from Baltimore
21st-century American poets
21st-century American actresses
21st-century African-American women writers
21st-century American women writers
21st-century African-American writers
20th-century African-American people
20th-century African-American women